Eupithecia corticata is a moth in the family Geometridae described by David Stephen Fletcher in 1950. It is found in the Democratic Republic of the Congo and Uganda.

References

Moths described in 1950
corticata
Moths of Africa